Portugal was represented for the second time by Simone de Oliveira, with the song "Desfolhada portuguesa", at the 1969 Eurovision Song Contest, which took place on 29 March in Madrid. "Desfolhada portuguesa" was chosen as the Portuguese entry at the Grande Prémio TV da Canção Portuguesa on 24 February. Actually, Simone de Oliveira was not the authors' first choice to defend the "Desfolhada portuguesa" at this festival, having even been invited to a week of the event.

Before Eurovision

Festival da Canção 1969
For the first time, the Grande Prémio TV da Canção Portuguesa was held with audience, at the Teatro São Luiz in Lisbon, hosted by Lurdes Norberto. Ten songs took part in the final. Ferrer Trindade conducted all but two songs. The results were determined by a distrital jury, composed by three members, each had 5 votes to be distributed among the songs it intended to award, making a total of 15 votes per district.

At Eurovision 
On the night of the final Oliveira performed 15th in the running order, following France and preceding Finland. At the close of the voting the song had received 4 points, coming 15th in the field of 16 competing countries. The orchestra during the Portuguese entry was conducted by Ferrer Trindade.

The Portuguese people followed the minute the presence of Simone de Oliveira in Eurovision, through the reports emitted by the radio and newspapers of that time. It was a great disappointment when it became known that Oliveira and the choristers were unwell on the eve of the event due to having eaten spoiled apple pie, which forced them to undergo medical intervention. Fortunately, this episode did not prevent Simone, the two members of the choir (Maria Alexandre de Brito and Natália Rodrigues de Matos) and the guitarist (António Luís Gomes) from taking the stage of the Teatro Real.

Despite the poor placing, when Simone returned by train from Madrid to Santa Apolónia Station, in Lisbon, she was received with the biggest demonstration ever given to a singer by the Portuguese people, even at a time when demonstrations were prohibited. The regime was unable to stop the strength of the people who made a point of paying homage to their representative at the Eurovision and sang "Desfolhada portuguesa" in unison. Simone de Oliveira was the target of the biggest demonstration ever made to a Portuguese singer.

Voting

References 

1969
Countries in the Eurovision Song Contest 1969
Eurovision